Cameron is a town in Le Flore County, Oklahoma, United States. It is part of the Fort Smith, Arkansas-Oklahoma Metropolitan Statistical Area. The population was 302 at the 2010 census, a decline of 3.2 percent from the figure of 312 recorded in 2000.

History
When the Fort Smith and Southern Railway laid tracks in the area of the present day town of Cameron in 1886–87, there was already a settlement of about 40 people. At the time of its founding, Cameron was located in Skullyville County, a part of the Moshulatubbee District of the Choctaw Nation.  The U. S. Post Office Department established a post office that it named Cameron, Indian Territory in 1888.
According to  Encyclopedia of Oklahoma History and Culture, the post office and town may have been named for either of two persons. One was William Cameron, a former Mine Inspector for Indian Territory. The other was James Cameron, an employee of the  Fort Smith and Southern Railway.

In 1883, James Reynolds, a successful rancher and entrepreneur, established the Cameron Institute, which was sponsored by the Presbyterian Church but was open to enrolling students of any denomination. It educated children from primary to high school level. Reynolds became a resident of Cameron, where he built an imposing home that had the appearance of a castle. The building is on the National Register of Historic Places.

Geography
Cameron is located at  (35.135722, -94.535561).

Demographics

As of the census of 2000, there were 312 people, 115 households, and 90 families residing in the town. The racial makeup of the town was 83.65% White, 0.32% African American, 11.54% Native American, and 4.49% from two or more races.

There were 115 households, out of which 35.7% had children under the age of 18 living with them, 53.9% were married couples living together, 15.7% had a female householder with no husband present, and 21.7% were non-families. 20.0% of all households were made up of individuals, and 8.7% had someone living alone who was 65 years of age or older. The average household size was 2.71 and the average family size was 3.11.

In the town, the population was spread out, with 26.6% under the age of 18, 9.3% from 18 to 24, 29.5% from 25 to 44, 23.1% from 45 to 64, and 11.5% who were 65 years of age or older. The median age was 35 years. For every 100 females, there were 113.7 males. For every 100 females age 18 and over, there were 104.5 males.

The median income for a household in the town was $23,750, and the median income for a family was $26,339. Males had a median income of $27,679 versus $17,321 for females. The per capita income for the town was $11,055. About 14.7% of families and 19.6% of the population were below the poverty line, including 32.9% of those under age 18 and 10.5% of those age 65 or over.

Notes

References

External links
 Encyclopedia of Oklahoma History and Culture - Cameron
 Oklahoma Digital Maps: Digital Collections of Oklahoma and Indian Territory

Towns in LeFlore County, Oklahoma
Towns in Oklahoma
Fort Smith metropolitan area